"Tequila Little Time" is a song recorded by American country music singer Jon Pardi. It was released on January 18, 2021, as the third single from his third studio album Heartache Medication. The song was written by Pardi, along Luke Laird and Rhett Akins, and produced by Pardi, Bart Butler and Ryan Gore.

Background
In an interview, Pardi called "Tequila Little Time" a fun and relaxing song, with a flavor of mariachi horns: "I feel like this goes great on a boat, a lake or pool and just any kind of atmosphere of having a good time. It's about picking up a girl that's down and maybe, maybe we want to do a shot of tequila? There's no answer, but maybe."

Music video
The music video was released on May 6, 2021, directed by Carlos Ruiz. It was shot at Flora-Bama Yacht Club in Orange Beach, Alabama.

Live performance
Jon Pardi performed "Tequila Little Time" on NBC's The Tonight Show Starring Jimmy Fallon.

Charts

Weekly charts

Year-end charts

Certifications

References

2021 songs
2021 singles
Jon Pardi songs
Songs written by Luke Laird
Songs written by Jon Pardi
Songs written by Rhett Akins
Capitol Records Nashville singles